Robert Hall Allen (11 June 1886 – 20 September 1981) was a British Army officer and an English footballer who played as a forward.

Playing career
In 1914, Allen signed for West Ham United from amateur club Corinthian, after impressing against West Ham at Upton Park on 27 April 1914 in a charity match for West Ham Hospital. The Westminster Gazette described Allen's performance as "heavy and fast", exerting "wonderful control over the light, dry ball, dribbling in a style reminiscent of the old-time Corinthians" whilst "giving perfect passes". Despite being signed in time for the 1914–15 season, Allen didn't play for the club due to his military commitments in World War I.

Following the culmination of the war, Allen returned to West Ham. On 1 November 1919, Allen made his debut for the club in a 2–1 home loss against Birmingham. Despite scoring West Ham's only goal after six minutes, Allen would not play for the club again, returning to play for Old Carthusians, with whom he began his career with.

Military career
During World War I, and after being educated at Charterhouse School followed by receiving a commission as an officer in the Royal Artillery after graduating from the Royal Military Academy, Woolwich in 1905, he served with the Royal Artillery in Gallipoli, where he was twice mentioned in dispatches and awarded the Military Cross (MC), and later in Egypt. In 1916 he married the daughter of a general.

He then attended the Staff College, Camberley in 1920 and was made Assistant Adjutant and Quartermaster General at Aldershot Command from 1937≈1938 and then specialised in anti-aircraft defence. After being promoted to major-general in 1939, the year World War II began, he took command of the 5th Anti-Aircraft Division which he led until 1941 when he took command of the 8th Anti-Aircraft Division (United Kingdom). He was made a CB in 1942, the same he retired from the army.

He spent his final years in Wiltshire, and listed his recreation as solving simple chess problems.

References

Bibliography

External links
Generals of World War II

1886 births
1981 deaths
Association football forwards
English footballers
Footballers from Kolkata
People educated at Charterhouse School
Old Carthusians F.C. players
Corinthian F.C. players
West Ham United F.C. players
English Football League players
British Army generals of World War II
British Army personnel of World War I
British Army major generals
Graduates of the Royal Military Academy, Woolwich
Graduates of the Staff College, Camberley
Royal Artillery officers
Companions of the Order of the Bath
Military personnel of British India